James Stirton (1833 – 14 January 1917) was a Scottish physician and one of Scotland's leading experts on cryptogamic botany. His investigations in bryology and lichenology earned him a world-wide reputation.

Biography
Stirton was born in Coupar Angus, Perthshire, in 1833.

Stirton taught mathematics from 1856 to 1858 at the Merchiston Castle School in Edinburgh. At the University of Edinburgh he graduated in 1857 L.R.C.P.Edin and in 1858 M.D.Edin. Soon after acquiring his M.D. he moved to Glasgow and established an extensive practice in obstetrics and gynaecology. In 1876 Stirton was appointed a lecturer in gynaecology at the Glasgow Royal Infirmary, where for many years he had charge of the gynaecological wards. In 1889 he became a professor of midwifery at Anderson’s College Medical School and held the professorship for about fifteen years.

Stirton made many visits to the Scottish mountains to investigate lichens and mosses and there discovered numerous species that were previously undescribed. Correspondents from Canada, South America, Australia, New Zealand, South Africa, and elsewhere sent him cryptogamic collections for study. He described over 100 new lichen species from Australia, including 8 new lichen species from Tasmania.

He contributed the section Cryptogamic Flora (an account of mosses and lichens) to the 1876 book Notes on the Fauna and Flora of the west of Scotland (edited by Edward R. Alston). Stirton served as President of the Glasgow Society of Field Naturalists and contributed numerous articles to the Report and Transactions of the Glasgow Society of Field Naturalists, Glasgow Naturalist, Grevillea, the Scottish Naturalist, the Annals of Scottish Natural History, and other periodicals.

Stirton was elected a Fellow of the Linnean Society of London in December 1875 and was a Corresponding Member of several European scientific societies. His cryptogamic herbarium is mostly in the Natural History Museum, London with most of the remainder in the Glasgow Museums.

In 1859 he visited Egypt and in 1872 published The Climate of Egypt and Nubia, with Medical Hints to Invalids, &c..

In 1860 he married Jessie McLaren. They had two daughters. The botanist and taxonomist Charles Howard Stirton (b. 1949) is related to James Stirton.

Stirton, along with John Stevenson, wrote an obituary for botanist Thomas King upon his death in 1896. It was published the following year in The Annals of Scottish Natural History.

Eponyms

Genus
Both lichens
 Stirtonia A.L.Sm. (Arthoniaceae family) 
 Stirtoniella D.J.Galloway, Hafellner & Elix (Ramalinaceae family)

Species
 Bryum stirtonii Schimp., 1876 synonym of Bryum elegans Nees, 1827
 Cryptothecia stirtonii A.L.Sm., 1926
 Grimmia stirtonii Schimp., 1876 synonym of Grimmia trichophylla Grev., 1824
 Lecidea stirtoniana Zahlbr., 1925
 Melanotheca stirtoniana Müll.Arg., 1894
 Opegrapha stirtonii Zahlbr., 1923 synonym of Patellaria stirtonii (Zahlbr.) Ertz, 2009
 Parmelia stirtonii Zahlbr., 1929 synonym of Menegazzia stirtonii (Zahlbr.) Kantvilas & Louwhoff, 2004
 Usnea stirtoniana Zahlbr., 1930
 Zygodon stirtonii Schimp., 1871 synonym of Zygodon viridissimus'' Dicks.) Brid., 1826

Selected publications

See also
 :Category:Taxa named by James Stirton

References

1833 births
1917 deaths
Academics of the University of Glasgow
Scottish botanists
19th-century Scottish medical doctors
Fellows of the Linnean Society of London
Plant collectors
Lichenologists